La Peca District is a district in the Bagua Province, Amazonas Region, Peru.

References

Districts of the Bagua Province
Districts of the Amazonas Region